Andy Watson may refer to:
Andy Watson (footballer, born 1959), Scottish footballer and coach
Andy Watson (footballer, born 1967), English footballer
Andy Watson (footballer, born 1978), English footballer
Andy Watson (mayor), mayor of Rangitikei in New Zealand
Andy Watson (Ontario politician), Canadian politician
Andy Watson (scientist), British scientist

See also
Andrew Watson (disambiguation)